Frank Bickerdike Martin (né Salvagio; February 25, 1908 – March 12, 1988) was a Canadian boxer who competed in the 1928 Summer Olympics in the flyweight division.

He was born in Montreal.

In 1928 he was eliminated in the second round of the flyweight class after losing his fight to the eventual silver medalist Armand Apell.

1928 Olympic results
Below is the record of Frankie Martin, a Canadian flyweight boxer who competed at the 1928 Amsterdam Olympics:

 Round of 32: bye
 Round of 16: lost to Armand Apell (France) by decision

External links

1908 births
1988 deaths
Boxers from Montreal
Flyweight boxers
Olympic boxers of Canada
Boxers at the 1928 Summer Olympics
Canadian male boxers